The National Aptitude Test in Architecture (NATA), is conducted by National Institute of Advanced Studies in Architecture (NIASA), which is a body of Council of Architecture, New Delhi in India. The National Aptitude Test in Architecture is a national level examination for admission to undergraduate courses in architecture. The test measures the aptitude of applicants for a specific field of study in areas like drawing and observation skills, sense of proportion, aesthetic sensitivity and critical thinking, qualities that have been acquired over a long period of time and that are related to architecture.

NATA or the JEE Mains Paper 2 exam are prescribed by the Council of Architecture as a compulsory criterion for taking admission to any Architectural College or course in India.

Scheme of examination 

 National Aptitude Test in Architecture (NATA) is being conducted by the Council of Architecture at national level for admission to 5 year B.Arch Degree Course at all recognized institutions across India. 
 NATA scores are used by admissions authorities of different Government, Govt. Aided & Unaided schools / colleges of Architecture. 
 The test measures drawing and observation skills, sense of proportion, aesthetic sensitivity and critical thinking ability. 
 The test is in two parts: The first part is a paper based drawing test and the second part is an online test with multiple choice questions on Physics, Chemistry, Mathematics and General Aptitude Test.
Nata is held as a one day examination, twice a year, across the country.
The Duration of Nata exam is of 3 hours and total marks for the exam is out of 200.
Aspiring candidates can register themselves on http://nata.in/ by filling in the Nata online application forms.

Eligibility required for NATA 
Candidates who have passed 10+2 or appearing in 10+2, with at least 50% marks in Physics, Chemistry and Maths and also 50% marks in aggregate or passed/appearing 10+3 Diploma exam with Maths as compulsory subject with at least 50% marks in aggregate. For SC/ST, OBC-NCL and PwD category, a 5% relaxation in marks is provides in 10+2 level/10+3 diploma level  and also in PCM.

NATA participating colleges in India 
NATA is the qualifying exam for admission to Architecture courses across India. Some NATA Participating Colleges or Institutions are: 

 East West School of Architecture, Bangalore
SRM University, Chennai
 Indian Institute of Engineering Science and Technology, Shibpur
 Deenbandhu Chhotu Ram University of Science and Technology, Murthal
 AU College of Engineering, Vishakhapatnam
 Guru Gobind Singh Indraprastha University, Delhi
 ITM University, Gwalior
 Ansal University, Gurgaon
Piloo Mody College of Architecture
 KIIT University, Bhubaneswar
 Bharath University, Chennai
 Sir J J College of Architecture, Mumbai
 Department of Architecture, IIT Roorkee
 School of Architecture and Planning, VMRF, Chennai
 Chandigarh College of Architecture, Chandigarh
 Department of Architecture, NIT Tiruchirapalli
 Department of Architecture, NIT Calicut
 Sushant School of Art and Architecture, Gurgaon
 Faculty of Architecture & Ekistics, JMI, New Delhi
 Department of Architecture, BIT, Mersa
 R V School of Architecture, RVCE, Bangalore
 Hindustan University, Kelambakkam
 Sharda University, Greater Noida
 CEPT University, Ahmedabad
 BS Abdur Rahman University, Chennai
 Sri Sri University

References

External links 
NATA-Official website
Amendment in eligibility Gazette 6 June 2017
We are KP Architecture Classes Provide Best NATA Entrance Exam Coaching in India 

 Architectural education